This is a list of named geological features (mostly craters) on Oberon.

Chasmata

There is one named chasm on Oberon.

Craters

Oberonian craters are named after characters in the plays of William Shakespeare.

External links
 USGS: Oberon nomenclature

Surface features of Uranian moons
Oberon (moon)

simple:List of geological features on Oberon